Cardenal Caro is an underground metro station of Line 3 of the Santiago Metro network, in Santiago, Chile. It is an underground, between the Los Libertadores and Vivaceta stations on Line 3. It is located at the intersection of Independencia Avenue with Cardenal Caro Street. The station was opened on 22 January 2019 as part of the inaugural section of the line, from Los Libertadores to Fernando Castillo Velasco.

Etymology
The station is located a few meters from Cardenal José María Caro Avenue. The Avenue remembers José María Caro, VIII Archbishop of Santiago de Chile and the first Chilean prelate to be created Cardinal by the Holy See.

References

External links 
Metro de Santiago website (in Spanish)

Santiago Metro stations
Railway stations opened in 2019